Sebastián Porto (born September 12, 1978 as Sebastián Porco) is an Argentine professional Grand Prix motorcycle road racer. He currently races in the Brazilian Moto 1000 GP Championship aboard a BMW S1000RR.

Career

Early career

Born in Rafaela, Santa Fe Province, Porto started his racing career at age 11, competing in the mini-motorcycle local circuit.
His first international competition was the 125cc 1994 Argentine Grand Prix, and only two years later he won the 250cc European Championship.

250cc, (1995-2006)

The bulk of his racing career was in the 250cc World Championship, starting in 1996 with Aprilia. In 1999 he moved to Yamaha and finished in 9th place in his first two years at the team and in 5th place in the 2002 championship, winning the Brazilian Grand Prix in Rio de Janeiro

He moved to the Repsol Aprilia team in 2004 and was championship runner-up, winning five Grands Prix and taking ten podium positions in total. In the 2005 season he claimed the Dutch TT at Assen and also finished second in the Australian Grand Prix, before the Repsol team moved to Honda bikes for 2006.

Rather than the expected switch to MotoGP after the 2006 season, he surprised everyone with the news of his retirement from motorcycle competition, claiming he had a hard time adjusting to the 250cc Honda bike, and that he was no longer enjoying his work. He returned to racing in late 2013.

2014, Wildcard Comeback on Moto2

Porto make one-off wildcard appearance at newly Termas Rio Hondo Grand Prix entered by Argentina TSR Motorsport riding a Kalex bikes, He finish the race in 23rd place after starting from 32nd on the grid.

Titles and achievements
Being the most visible exponent of motorcycling in Argentina, he has received all 12 Argentine Olimpia Awards for that sport between 1994 and 2005.

1992 - Argentine Promotional 100cc Champion
1994 - Argentine 250cc Champion
1995 - Spanish 250cc Champion (Open Ducados)
1996 - European 250cc Champion
1999 - 9th place in the 250cc World Championship
2000 - Michel Metraux Trophy for best rider on a non-works bike
2000 - 9th place in the 250cc World Championship
2002 - Brazilian Grand Prix 250cc winner
2002 - 5th place in the 250cc World Championship
2004 - Five Grand Prix wins (Czech Republic, Australia, Qatar, Netherlands, Italy) and ten total podium finishes
2004 - 2nd place in the 250cc World Championship
2005 - Dutch TT 250cc winner

Career statistics

Grand Prix motorcycle racing

Races by year
(key) (Races in bold indicate pole position; races in italics indicate fastest lap)

References

External links

Interview
ESPN profiles 
On his retirement 

1978 births
Living people
People from Rafaela
Argentine motorcycle racers
250cc World Championship riders
TC 2000 Championship drivers
Top Race V6 drivers
Argentine racing drivers
Moto2 World Championship riders
Sportspeople from Santa Fe Province